Saranam Ayyappa is 1980 Indian Tamil-language film, Directed and produced by Dasarathan. The film stars Jayabharathi the lead role. Kamal Haasan made a guest appearance and recorded a song in his voice in the film.

Cast 
 Boopathi
Raviraj 
Aboo backer as Inspector 
 Rajakrishna
Jayabharathi as Saraswathi
Vijayan as Vijay
Radha Ravi
M. R. Radha
Manorama
Suruli Rajan
Sarath Babu
Poornima
Kamal Haasan Guest appearance 
V.K.Ramasamy as Gurusamy
Goundamani as 'Jailer' Jagadep
Jaishankar as CID Shankar
Sripriya Guest appearance 
K. Bhagyaraj Guest appearance 
Rajinikanth (uncredited appearance)
M. N. Nambiar (uncredited appearance)
R. Muthuraman (uncredited appearance)
Srikanth (uncredited appearance)
Dr. Rajkumar (uncredited appearance)

Soundtrack 
The Music was Composed by Chandrabose. Lyrics are penned by Kannadasan, Puvai Senguttuvan, Muthulingam, Pulavar Maari, Dasarathan.

References

External links 
 

1980 films
1980s Tamil-language films
Films scored by Chandrabose (composer)